William de Forz (died 1195)  was a minor Anglo-Norman noble, by origin from Fors in Poitou.

He became by the right of his wife (jure uxoris) second Count of Aumale (or Albemarle) following his marriage to Hawise, sole heiress of William le Gros, Earl of York, Count of Aumale  and William de Forz, 3rd Earl of Albemarle was their son.

Philip Augustus took control of Aumale (also known as Albemarle) in the 1190s, thus depriving the Anglo-Norman Earls of Albemarle of their continental land-holdings.

Forz
William Malet's daughter, Mabel, married Hugh de Vivonia. Their son is referred to as William de Forz (de Vivonia). Some have suggested a relationship between the families. Their coats of arms each appear in the roll of arms of Henry III.

Notes

1195 deaths
Anglo-Normans
Year of birth unknown
Earls of Albemarle
Christians of the Third Crusade